Vista Alegre District is one of twelve districts of the province Rodríguez de Mendoza in Peru.

External links
  official municipal website

References

Districts of the Rodríguez de Mendoza Province
Districts of the Amazonas Region